Imagine That is a country/pop song written for Patsy Cline by Justin Tubb.

"Imagine That" was one of three minor hits produced by Patsy Cline in 1962. By this time as well, Patsy Cline was already a very successful Country/Pop singer, racking up a string of major hits like "I Fall to Pieces", "Walkin' After Midnight", "Crazy" and "She's Got You". "Imagine That" however was not as successful as its counterparts. The song only reached to #21 on the Country charts and to #90 on the Pop charts, failing to gain big success. "Imagine That" was also never featured on her 1962 album, called Sentimentally Yours. The song discusses how the singer is so devoted to her lover that nothing the lover may do will change that devotion.

The song was also recorded by Sara Evans on her 1997 debut album Three Chords and the Truth.

1962 singles
Patsy Cline songs
Song recordings produced by Owen Bradley
Songs written by Justin Tubb
1962 songs
Decca Records singles

it:Immagina che